Salvatore Martinez (Enna, 4 May 1966) is an Italian scholar, the first layperson president of the Rinnovamento nello Spirito Santo (Parte de Catholic Charismatic Renewal) in Italy. President of the Vatican Foundation "International Center Family of Nazareth" and personal representative of the OSCE Chairperson-in-Office 2018 on Combating Racism, Xenophobia, and Discrimination, also focusing on Intolerance and Discrimination against Christians and Members of other Religions".

Biography 
Salvatore was born and brought up in Enna, the heart of Sicily, and is married to Luciana Leone.

He graduated in paleography and musical philology at the University of Pavia, with honors, with a thesis on the history of the pontiffs of the first millennium in the light of the liturgical innovations contained in Liber Pontificalis.

He has published twenty-six  books. The last one, which was published in October 2018, is dedicated to Pope Paul VI, when he was declared a Saint.

Among the books, published by Edizioni San Paolo, Sospinti dallo Spirito (Moved by the Spirit), in May 2014, was translated in Spanish, English, Portuguese and French. 

He has and continues to hold lectures, courses and consultations for Pontifical and Catholic Universities in Rome and several other Countries, for Institutions and Institutes of Formation in Italy and abroad. In the current academic year, that is 2018-2019 he conducted a Course of Specialization in Dogmatic Theology on the "Theology of the Holy Spirit".

He collaborates with Italian and foreign magazines on themes of spirituality or on subjects of Social Doctrine of the Church.

Salvstore has intervened in national and international Conferences in 44 countries on all five continents on subjects of spirituality, with particular reference to youth, families, priests, the promotion of the laity, social discomfort, the Social Doctrine of the Church, invited by Vatican Dicasteries, by National Bishops’ Conferences, Universities, Public Institutions, Cultural and social Institutions.

He has organized or collaborated in the organization of International Events (World Youth and Family Days, Gatherings, Conferences) organized by Vatican Dicasteries, by Catholic Charismatic Renewal or Renewal in the Spirit, by Ecumenical or Interreligious Organizations, by governmental and non-governmental organizations in Italy, Europe and the Americas.

Positions and main activities 
Since 1997 he is the first layperson to preside the Rinnovamento nello Spirito Santo (RnS, Renewal in the Spirit of Italy). RnS is a private Association of faithful whose Statutes have been recognized by the Italian Bishops’ Conference (CEI) and by the Holy See. It has around 1900 Groups and Communities in Italy, with over 250.000 participants, nine overseas Missions (among which are in Moldova [and Transnistria], Israel, and Jordan), Schools of formation, a Publishing house, a Foundation for the promotion of social utility projects, a Cooperative for services related to the organization of events.

Since 2012 he is President of the Vatican Foundation "International Center Family of Nazareth" (CIFN) erected ex audientia by Pope Benedict XVI on October 17, 2012, with juridical canonical public and Vatican civil personality, for the development of the Magisterium of the Family in the world, with a special mandate to build and manage the "Home of the Pope for families" in Nazareth, as an ecumenical and interreligious way of dialogue and of peace in the Middle East. (A dream of Pope John Paul II announced at Rio de Janeiro on the occasion of the II World Meeting of Families in 1997, a desire that was renewed by Benedict XVI in 2009 and by Pope Francis in 2014 on the occasion of the respective papal trips to the Holy Land).

As President of the Vatican Foundation, "International Center Family of Nazareth," on November 15 and 16 he intervened at the «World Tolerance Summit», held at the Armani Hotel in Dubai (UAE). The Conference, first worldwide Event on the theme of Tolerance, peace and of the cultural understanding of humanity, was promoted by the International Institute for Tolerance under the patronage of Sheikh Mohammed Bin Rashid Al Maktoum, UAE Vice President, Prime Minister and Emirate of Dubai, and attended by over 1,500 government leaders.

On January 2, 2018 he was nominated Personal Representative of the OSCE 2018 Chairperson-in-Office for Dimension 3, to "Combat Racism, Xenophobia and Discrimination, with a focus on Intolerance and Discrimination against Christians and members of Other Religions". The Organization for Security and Cooperation in Europe represents 57 Countries (Europe 44, Asia 11, USA and Canada, representing a population of over one billion) The mission of OSCE is articulated into 3 Dimensions: Politics - military Security; Economy and environment; Human rights.

As part of the OSCE Representation, he was one of the promoters and organizers of the International Conference of Rome on the "Responsibility of States, Institutions and Individuals in the fight against Anti-Semitism in the OSCE area", scheduled within the framework of the Italian OSCE Presidency 2018, held in Rome on January 29, 2018 at the Ministry of Foreign Affairs and International Cooperation - Hall of International Conferences.

He went on mission to Toronto in Canada, (October 1–2) - Montreal (October 3) - Ottawa (October 4–5), on a "joint visit" with the other two special Representatives of the OSCE Presidency, Rabbi Andrew Baker (for Antisemitism) and prof. Bulent Senay (for Islamophobia). The visit included several meetings and hearings with the main Representatives of government Institutions and of civil society.

During the year 2018, within the OSCE context, he intervened as Speaker in the following international meetings:
 European Academy of Religion (EuARe), I Annual Conference, Inaugural Address, Bologna, 5 March 2018); 
 Working Group Breakfast on Intercultural and Religious, organized by the specific Commission of European Parliament, on the theme: "Freedom" (Bruselles, 23–25 April 2018);
 International Ministerial Conference on the theme of victims of ethnic and religious violence in the Middle East, organized by the Government of Belgium and Lebanon (Bruselles, 14 May 2018);
 15th European Meeting of the Balkans – inspired by the tradition of the National Prayer Breakfast – organized by a Commission of the Parliament of Albania, on the subject: "Love your neighbor as yourself" (Tirana, 25–27 May 2018);
 International Seminar Supplementary Human Dimension Meeting, organized by OSCE and ODIHR, on the subject: "Child Trafficking – From Prevention to Protection" (Vienna, 28–29 May 2018);
 International Conference on the theme: "Religious freedom in Russia. The way of dialogue", organized by "St. Gregory the Theologian Charity Foundation" of the Orthodox Patriarch of Moscow in collaboration with the Presidency of the Russian Federation (Moscow, 31 May 2018);
 "Faith and Freedom Summit: practicing what we preach in Europe", organized by the Alliance of Conservatives and Reformists in Europa (28 June 2018 - Solvay Library, Bruselles);
 International Conference on the theme: "Interreligious Engagement and Freedom of Religion or Belief (FoRB): a new policy approach for the Mediterranean", organized by OSCE, Institute for the Studies of International Politics – ISPI and the University of Sussex (London, 12 July 2018, The House of Commons, Palace of Westminster).
 "Human Dimension Implementation Meeting" (HDIM), organized by ODIHR - Office for Democratic Institutions and Human Rights) (Warsaw, 10–21 September 2018, Sofitel Victoria Warsaw Hotel).
 "VI Congress of Leaders world and traditional Religions" (Astana, 10 – 11 October 2018, The Palace of Peace and Accord).
 Conference "Combatting Intolerance and Discrimination, with a Focus on Discrimination Based on Religion or Belief: Towards a Comprehensive Response in the OSCE Region", organized by ODIHR and the Ministry of Foreign Affairs and International Cooperation (Rome, 22 October, Hall of International Conferences of the Ministry (Farnesina).
 25th Ministerial Council Meeting, to conclude the Italian OSCE Presidency 2018, held in Milan at the MI.CO Conference Center.

He is Consultor, a nomination of Pope Benedict XVI, ad quinquennium, from April 2012, of the Pontifical Council for the Promotion of the New Evangelization.

He was Consultor, until the dissolution of the Dicastery, of the Pontifical  Council for the Laity, nominated ad quinquennium by Pope Benedict XVI in March 2008, appointment renewed by Pope Francis in 2013.

He was Consultor, until the dissolution of the Dicastery, of the Pontifical  Council for the Family Pontifical Council for the Family, nominated ad quinquennium by Pope Benedict XVI, in September 2009, appointment renewed by Pope Francis in 2014.

Since 1997 he is president of Fondazione "Alleanza del Rinnovamento nello Spirito Onlus", an organization recognized by the Republic of Italy and the Bishops' Conference of Italy, which operates in the field of formation of formators with the organization and the promotion of national and interregional Schools dedicated to families, to youth, to animators and operators in the social field, as well as through specific initiatives for the reduction of social discomfort of disadvantaged persons. From 2002, the Foundation has begun a mission in Chisinau, capital of the Republic of Moldova, with the creation of a missionary Center and of a Home to welcome the poor; it has also stipulated protocols of understanding with government socio-health Institutions to take care of children afflicted with mental handicap.

Since 2014, in agreement with Prison Fellowship Italia onlus and RnS, in collaboration with the Ministry of Justice and the Inspectorate General of the Prison Chaplains, on the occasion of Christmas the foundation promotes "L'Altra Cucina... Per un Pranzo d'Amore" (The Other Kitchen … For a Lunch of Love), a great charity event of "social justice" in favor of prisoners. In 2018 the initiative was held in 13 prisons of Italy involving over 2,500 prisoners.

Since 2000 he is president of the foundation, Institute of human promotion "Mons. Francesco Di Vincenzo", a charitable organization (recognized  by the Republic of Italy in 1995) and Ecclesiastical (recognized by the Diocese of Piazza Armerina in 1989) for the integration of social formations which are the basis of the dignity of the human person (Church, Family, Culture, Work). The Foundation has created the "Mario e Luigi Sturzo ‘Polo of excellence of solidarity and human promotion’", at the Historical site of the Sturzo Brothers (now owned by the Diocese of Piazza Armerina), a social Work for the redemption of prisoners, former prisoners and their families, as well as unaccompanied immigrant children.

On the occasion of the centenary of "Appello ai liberi e forti" (Appeal to the free and strong) (18 January 2019), initiatives are planned to remember and celebrate the spiritual, human, cultural and political heritage of the thought of don Luigi Sturzo. In particular, an International Conference in Caltagirone, on April 12–14, to review the relevance of the 12 explanatory points of the Appeal.

Since April 2016 he is President of the Association "Laudato si" for the national project "Lab.Ora. A thousand youth for a leadership of service". The Initiative represents a response implementing the appeal of Pope Francis to Christians present at the V National Ecclesial Convention, of Florence 2015. It is an innovative and systemic, interdisciplinary format open to international developments and collaborations, which brings together an expert and representative group of laypeople, ecclesiastics and academics who have decided to get involved in a free and generous personal testimony at the service of young people who distinguish themselves in local communities, for the creation of a new generation of leaders and for their new social and political leadership in Italy, in a special way through innovation in giving value to local resources.

As part of the initiatives promoted by the Association, on December 7, 2018, in Rome, at the Parco Tirreno Residence, a Conference was held on the subject "Physiology of a crisis. A systemic response". Numerous young adults participated, who had taken earlier taken part in the Lab.Ora schools held in Campania; Piedmont-Valle D'Aosta-Liguria; Sicily; and Emilia Romagna- Marche. Authoritative speakers intervened with their contributions.

From September 22  to October 5, 2019,  he was on mission to China, which included diplomatic meetings with local authorities, inter-religious dialogue and formation reserved for some ecclesial communities. In particular, at the invitation of the Venerable Shi Yong Xin, 30th Abbot of the Temple of Shaolin, a culture recognized in 2010 by UNESCO, as World Cultural Heritage. During the mission, at the suggestion of Bishop Sun Jigen, he coordinated the formation for priests, religious and laity in the Diocese of Handan, the main Center of study of the Christian faith for the whole of China.

Since 2017 he is President of the Observatory on Religious Minorities in the World and on Respect for Religious Freedom. An Observatory promoted by the Italian Ministry of Foreign Affairs and of International Cooperation (MAECI). "The activity of the Observatory is part of the Italian foreign policy in favor of the protection and promotion of the freedom of religion, of public profession of religious belief, of the rights of those belonging to ethnic and religious minorities, in bilateral and multilateral relationships and in programs of Cooperation towards development, with particular attention to the new generations, so that they acquire awareness of the protection of human rights". (Statutes, art 1.2) "The Observatory coordinates, through MAECI, its action with the work carried out by the Italian diplomatic missions abroad on themes and projects of common interest and keeping in line with the objectives assigned (Statutes, art. 3.1)

Since 2002 he coordinates the Italian Delegation which participates at the "National Prayer Breakfast" (NPB) in Washington, which in 2019 is the 67th edition. The NPB is the biggest inter-religious network of leaders (an international Convention is held every year in Washington, with invitations from an ad hoc Commission of the Senate and the Congress of the USA, with the ruling President and Vice President always present) who recognize in Jesus, regardless of the profession of a faith or belonging to a particular religion, a "model" of leadership which places at the center universal values of the Gospel and therefore the human person, their integral dignity, ideals of peace and solidarity among the Nations. Over 150 Countries are represented every year. He was a speaker at the 63° NPB, on February 4, 2015, the only European Christian to give a speech during the session dedicated to the Middle East, together with Jewish and Muslim speakers on the theme "Family, Middle East and Pope Francis".

He is member of the International Charismatic Consultation (ICC), an ecumenical organization which brings together the principal Christian charismatic leaders of the world (representing over 400 million Christians).

He is International Vice-President of Youth Arise International (YAI), a project of formation for evangelization for the youth, which organizes events throughout the world, in particular gatherings leading to the World Youth Day organized by the Vatican with the presence of the Pope (the first YAI gathering was held in 1997 in France).

He is the founding member of the Committee and of the Association Scienza e Vita (Science and Life), a national Body with local offices throughout Italy, to which men and women of various ideals and inspirations involved in the field of bioethics are involved.

He is a historical member of the "Forum of Family Associations", a national body which brings together 48 Associations, 18 Regional Forums and 564 Associations for the promotion and safeguard of the rights of the family.

From 2011 to 2014, he was Member of the Office of Presidency of Rete in Opera, for two terms, a national Body to which 20 Associations and Movements - Catholic or of Christian inspiration – adhere to, a widespread "Work of networks" founded on the principles of social Doctrine of the Church, expression of the autonomy and of the constitutive role of civil society on issues of major public relevance.

He participated as Auditor, nominated by the Pope, at the XIII Ordinary General Assembly of the Synod of Bishops on the theme: "The new Evangelization for the transmission of the Christian faith" held in the Vatican from October 7 to 28, 2012.

He was part of the Delegation of the Latin Patriarchate of Jerusalem, on the invitation of the Authorities of Israel, Jordan and Palestine, on the occasion of the Pontifical journey of Pope Francis to the Holy Land (May 24–26, 2014).

As President of Renewal in the Spirit of Italy he organized and presided at the Olympic Stadium of Rome (June 1–2, 2014), with the special presence of Pope Francis, the 37th Convocation of the Renewal with 52.000 participants represented by 64 Countries. It was the first time that a Pope intervened at a Gathering in a Stadium organized by an ecclesial Movement.
As President of RnS he organized and presided in St. Peter’s Square (3 July 2015) an International event "Voices in prayer for the martyrs of today. For a spiritual Ecumenism and for an Ecumenism of blood", with the participation of Pope Francis, on the occasion of the 38th Convocation of the Renewal. 11 high level Representatives of the three Christian traditions intervened (Catholic, Protestant, Orthodox) and artists Andrea Bocelli, Noa, Don Moen, Darlene Zschech with 35.000 participants.

As President of RnS, since 2007 he plans, presides and leads an annual, special National Pilgrimage to the Holy Land, with song and music, mystagogical conferences and spiritual experiences in the principal places of the Christian faith, even through the involvement of the Arab Christian community in Israel and in Palestine, as well as the representatives of the 3 Abrahamic religions present in the Holy Land, beginning with the Latin Patriarchate of Jerusalem and the Custos of the Holy Land.

As President of RnS from 2008 he plans, presides and leads an annual National Pilgrimage of Families for the Family in Pompei, a popular gesture of prayer which unites grandparents, parents and children through the "Rosary of the Family", in collaboration with Pontifical Council for the Family (now Dicastery for Laity, Family and Life), with the Office of the Bishops’ Conference for the Family and the National Forum of Family Associations.

As President of the Vatican Foundation "CIFN", on the occasion of the Extraordinary Synod of Bishops on the Family, under the aegis of the Secretary General of the Synod, he organized and presided at the Pontifical Urbaniana University (Rome, 11 October 2014) an International Conference on the theme: "A glimpse of truth and of mercy on the Family in the Middle East. Speakers: Patriarchs Card. Béchara Boutros RAÏ, (for the Maronites), Fouad TWAL (for the Latins), Ignace Youssif III YOUNAN, (for the Syrians), Louis Raphaël I SAKO (for the Chaldeans).

As President of the Vatican Foundation "CIFN", following the publication of the Apostolic Exhortation of Pope Francis on love in the family, "Amoris Laetitia", he organized and presided, at the Pontifical Urbaniana University (Rome, 21 September 2016), an International Conference on the theme: "The mother of all crisis is spiritual! For a Culture of encounter (Pope Francis)", an intercultural reading with high level representatives of the three monotheistic religions. Among these Maria Teresa Grand Duchess of Luxembourg and Mohammad Sammak, member of the Board of Presidency of World Conference Religion for Peace.

As President of the Observatory on Religious Minorities in the World and on the Respect for Religious Freedom promoted by the Italian Ministry of Foreign Affairs and of International Cooperation (MAECI), he organized and presided - in Rome (21 December 2017, Auditorium of the Pontifical Antonianum University and the Sala Conferenze Internazionali at the Palazzo della Farnesina) and Assisi (22 December, Sala Papale del Sacro Convento, Sala della Spogliazione del Palazzo Vescovile and the Porziuncola in the Basilica of Santa Maria degli Angeli) - an International Conference on the theme: "Dialogue among cultures and religions in the promotion of peace: 800 years of Franciscan presence in the Holy Land" in collaboration with the Custos of the Holy Land, and the participation of the high level diplomatic and religious representatives from the Middle East as well as those accredited in Italy, belonging to the three Abrahamic religious traditions.

Organizations 
 International Charismatic Consultation, an ecumenical organization that brings together the principal Christian charismatic leaders in the world.
 Association "Scienza e Vita" (brings together bodies of Christian inspiration in the bioethical field.)
 Directive of the "Forum of Family Associations" which brings together 52 Associations, Bodies and Institutions linked to the promotion of the family
 Office of the presidency of "Rete in Opera" which brings together the 18 principal catholic organizations or of Christian inspiration who operate in the social field in Italy (2011-2014)
 Foundation, Institute of human promotion "Mons. Francesco Di Vincenzo", a corporate body to work for the integration of social forms that are the foundation of human dignity (Church, family, education, work), which has given birth to "Polo di eccellenza della solidarietà e della promozione umana «Mario e Luigi Sturzo»", a social work for the redemption of prisoners and their families. President 2000-
 Foundation "Casa Museo Sturzo" - President
 Foundation "Alleanza del Rinnovamento nello Spirito" - President
 Foundation Moldova "Alleanza del RnS" - President
 Youth Arise International - International vice president

Publications 
 Come colui che serve, 1997, Coop. RnS 
 L’accoglienza, 1999, Edizioni RnS 
 Voglio parlare ai vostri cuori, 2000, Edizioni RnS
 Sulle orme dello Spirito, 2002, Edizioni RnS
 Esperienza dei carismi - In un incontro di preghiera comunitaria (con padre Giuseppe Bentivegna), 2002, Edizioni RnS 
 La guida pastorale - Missione di un responsabile nel servizio carismatico (con padre Giuseppe Bentivegna), 2002, Edizioni RnS
 Per un Roveto Ardente di preghiera, 2002, Edizioni RnS
 Voi fratelli non lasciatevi scoraggiare nel fare il bene, 2003, Edizioni RnS
 Sintesi del cammino spirituale e pastorale, 2004, Edizioni RnS
 Il Vangelo dello Spirito Santo in Giovanni Paolo II (a cura di Salvatore Martinez), 2005, Edizioni RnS 
 Cristoterapia della gioia, 2006, Edizioni RnS
 Uno solo è lo Spirito, 2006, Edizioni RnS
 C’è una speranza che non delude, 2007, Edizioni RnS
 Un tempo per seminare un tempo per raccogliere, 2007, Edizioni RnS
 Una straordinaria apologia della Spirito Santo (a cura di Salvatore Martinez), 2008, Edizioni RnS 
 Ho visto il Signore, 2008, Edizioni RnS
 Famiglia ritorna all’Amore, 2009, Edizioni RnS
 Ridire la fede, ridare la speranza, rifare la carità, 2011, Edizioni RnS 
 Abbiamo bisogno di questo Rinnovamento!, 2011, Edizioni RnS 
 I cinque sguardi di Maria, 2012, Edizioni RnS
 Spalanca il cuore a Gesù e annuncia il Vangelo, 2013, Edizioni RnS
 Papa Francesco e lo Spirito Santo (a cura di Salvatore Martinez), 2014, Edizioni RnS
 Sospinti dallo Spirito - Ripartiamo dal Cenacolo, 2014, Edizioni San Paolo
 Il Rinnovamento serve alla Chiesa, 2015, Edizioni RnS
 Rimane con voi e sarà in voi. The true crisis is spiritual, but the Holy Spirit is not in crisis, 2017, Edizioni RnS 
 Paolo VI. Umanità e spiritualità, 2018, Edizioni RnS

Notes

1966 births
Living people
Religious leaders from the Province of Enna
Italian Roman Catholics
Italian religious writers